The King's Jester is a 1941 Italian historical drama film directed by Mario Bonnard and starring Michel Simon, María Mercader and Rossano Brazzi. The film is an adaptation of the play Le roi s'amuse by Victor Hugo and uses music from Verdi's later opera Rigoletto. It is set at the court of Francis I of France in the Sixteenth century.

Cast
 Michel Simon as Rigoletto
 María Mercader as Gilda
 Rossano Brazzi as Il re Francesco Iº
 Doris Duranti as Margot
 Paola Barbara as La duchessa di Cosse
 Elli Parvo as La zingara
 Carlo Ninchi as Il conte di Saint Vallier
 Juan de Landa as Sparafucile
 Loredana as Diana Di Saint Vallier
 Franco Coop as Il duca di Cosse
 Corrado Racca as Signor De Brion
 Giulio Battiferri as Uno dei rapitori di Gilda
 Oreste Bilancia as Un cortegiano
 Gildo Bocci as Il Gran Visir
 Ruggero Capodaglio as Un cortegiano
 Stanis Cappello as Un cortegiano
 Renato Chiantoni as Il terzo zingaro
 Gemma D'Alba as Signora De Pardaillan
 Alfredo De Antoni as Un cortegiano
 Liana Del Balzo as La marchesa che nasconde l'età
 Cesare Fantoni as Il sergente Roland
 Oreste Fares as Il servitore di Saint Vallier
 Adele Garavaglia as Costanza, la governante
 Fausto Guerzoni as Il primo zingaro
 Guido Morisi as Il duca De La Tour
 Giacomo Moschini as Signor De Pardaillan
 Giovanni Onorato as Il secondo zingaro
 Amina Pirani Maggi as Berarda, governante di Gilda
 Cesare Polesello as Il quarto zingaro
 Evaristo Signorini as Un cortegiano
 Aldo Silvani as Il boia
 Edda Soligo as Un'amica della duchessa di Cosse
 Edoardo Toniolo as Il poeta Marot

References

Bibliography

External links 
 

1941 films
1940s historical musical films
Italian historical musical films
1940s Italian-language films
Films directed by Mario Bonnard
Italian black-and-white films
Films set in the 16th century
Films set in France
Italian films based on plays
Films based on operas
Films based on works by Victor Hugo
1940s Italian films